Thomas Shone (August 6th 1784–February 20th 1868) was an 1820 Settler in Cape Colony. Born in London, he went to sea at 18 (or before) and while on board the 2nd Voyage of Lord Nelson, was captured by the French on 14 August 1803. He was imprisoned in Givet and Sarrelivre prison camps, where he learnt his trade of shoe-making. Thomas Shone was not a member of the Royal Navy, but an Ordinary Seaman, joining the East India Company in 1802, as per ships' documents and French POW records.

With the aid of French Freemasons, he escaped to England where he started a family in London. In 1820 his three children were Wesleyan, baptised soon before boarding Nautilus with his wife Sarah Phillips, and sailed to Algoa Bay. He had joined a party as a labourer, despite his ability to read and write. As part of the Scott party, which meant he was bound to work at his master's command, almost as a slave for five years to repay the cost of his voyage, they were settled close to the Xhosa border and were the last to leave after the first Xhosa war broke out, losing all their belongings. He built up a second farm which was again burnt down in a later border war. On the death of his wife Sarah in 1837 he became melancholy and decided to write a daily journal, which he continued for 30 years. The journal provides insight into the day-to-day lives of the 1820 Settlers and their hardships. It is located at the Cory Library at Rhodes University.

His grandson, Thomas Leopold Hamilton Shone, founded the manganese mining industry in South Africa; another of his other grandsons, Edward Clement Roberts, was the first man to mine anthracite in the Maclear district of South Africa.

References
 The Albany Journals of Thomas Shone: ed. Penelope Silva (1992) (Graham's Town Series 12.) Cape Town: Maskew Miller Longman, for Rhodes University, Grahamstown.
 Shones of South Africa : Dudley K Shone

1784 births
1868 deaths
1820 Settlers